Screven County High School is a public high school located in Sylvania, Georgia, United States. The school is part of the Screven County School System, which serves Screven County.

The school offers athletics, band, and a quizbowl team along with many clubs, such as Future Business Leaders of America (FBLA), Family Career and Community Leaders of America (FCCLA), National FFA Organization, Rotary Service Club, National Honor Society, Skills USA, German Club, Spanish Club, Student Government, Technology Student Association (TSA), Y-Club, and 4-H Club.

Brian Scott is the principal. Todd Wall and Lydia Bragg are the vice principals.

Notable alumni
 Lee Berger (class of 1984), National Geographic paleontologist and explorer
 Macay McBride, former professional baseball player (Atlanta Braves, Detroit Tigers)

References

http://screven2.hs.schooldesk.net/Calendars/SportsSchedules/tabid/6038/Default.aspx

External links
 Screven County School System website
 Screven County High School website

Schools in Screven County, Georgia
Public high schools in Georgia (U.S. state)
Schools accredited by the Southern Association of Colleges and Schools